Lidia Gueiler Tejada was inaugurated on 16 November 1979 as Provisional President of Bolivia and formed her cabinet on 19 November 1979.

MNR – Revolutionary Nationalist Movement

PDC – Christian Democratic Party

PCML – Communist Party of Bolivia (Marxist–Leninist)

PRA – Authentic Revolutionary Party

MNRI – Leftwing Revolutionary Nationalist Movement

MIN – Movement of the National Left

mil – military

ind – independent

Notes

Cabinets of Bolivia
Cabinets established in 1979
Cabinets disestablished in 1980
1979 establishments in Bolivia
1980 disestablishments in Bolivia